Wickhamford is a village and a civil parish in  Worcestershire, England. It is situated on  the A44 road approximately  halfway between the towns of Evesham and Broadway. It is mentioned in 1086 in the Domesday Book under the name of Wiquene  when it was owned by  Evesham Abbey.

Wickhamford Manor

The manor was built in the 16th century on land belonging  to the abbey. It was later sold to Thomas Throckmorton by Elizabeth I. In 1594 it was purchased from the  Crown by Sir Samuel Sandys and remained in the family until its sale in 1863.

St. John the Baptist Church
The 13th-century parish Church of St. John the Baptist shows a close connection of the Sandys family with the American colonists. It can be seen in the floor slab monument to Penelope Washington within the altar rails. The oak chancel gates were installed in the 17th century with a monument to  the Sandys family on the north side. Penelope Washington, whose mother married Sir Samuel Sandys and moved to the Manor House, was a distant relative of George Washington, the first President of the United States of America.

References

External links

Historical records and photographs

Villages in Worcestershire